Dana Angluin is a professor emeritus of computer science at Yale University.  She is known for foundational work in computational learning theory and distributed computing.

Education
Angluin received her B.A. (1969) and Ph.D. (1976) at University of California, Berkeley. Her thesis, entitled "An application of the theory of computational complexity to the study of inductive inference"  was one of the first works to apply complexity theory to the field of inductive inference. Angluin joined the faculty at Yale in 1979.

Research
Angluin has written highly cited papers on computational learning theory, where she studied learning from noisy examples and learning regular sets from queries and counterexamples (the L* algorithm). In distributed computing, she co-invented the population protocol model and studied the problem of consensus. In probabilistic algorithms, she has studied randomized algorithms for Hamiltonian circuits and matchings.

Angluin helped found the Computational Learning Theory (COLT) conference, and has served on program committees and steering committees for COLT  She served as an area editor for Information and Computation from 1989–1992. She organized Yale's Computer Science Department's Perlis Symposium in April 2001: "From Statistics to Chat: Trends in Machine Learning". She is a member of the Association for Computing Machinery and the Association for Women in Mathematics.

Angluin has also published works on Ada Lovelace and her involvement with the Analytical Engine.

Selected publications
 Dana Angluin (1988). Queries and concept learning. Machine Learning. 2 (4): 319-342.
 
Dana Angluin and Philip Laird (1988). Learning from noisy examples. Machine Learning 2 (4), 343-370.
 Dana Angluin and Leslie Valiant (1979). Fast probabilistic algorithms for Hamiltonian circuits and matchings. Journal of Computer and system Sciences 18 (2), 155-193
 
  
Dana Angluin, James Aspnes, Zoë Diamadi, Michael J Fischer, René Peralta (2004). Computation in networks of passively mobile finite-state sensors. Distributed computing 18 (4), 235-253.

See also

 Automata theory
 Distributed computing
 Computational learning theory

References

External links

 Angluin's home page at Yale University
 

Theoretical computer scientists
Living people
American women computer scientists
Yale University faculty
University of California, Berkeley alumni
Place of birth missing (living people)
Year of birth missing (living people)
20th-century American women scientists
21st-century American women scientists
American computer scientists
20th-century American scientists
21st-century American scientists
American women academics